{{DISPLAYTITLE:AqTaylor}}

The siglum AqTaylor (also: Taylor-Schechter 12.186 + AS.78.412; 12.187; 12.188; vh203, TM 62306, LDAB 3469) are fragments of a palimpsest containing a portion of the Palestinian Talmud in upper script, and part of the Book of Psalms of Aquila's Greek translation of the Hebrew Bible in lower script. This latter is a Greek biblical manuscript written in codex form. This manuscript has been dated after the middle of the fifth century C.E., but not later than the beginning of the sixth century C.E.

History 
A number of manuscripts were found at Geniza, in the Ben Ezra Synagogue, Egypt, and these palimpsest fragments were brought to Cambridge by Solomon Schechter. The fragments were published by Charles Taylor in his work Hebrew-Greek Cairo Genizah Palimpsests in 1900, pp. 54–65.

Description 
The manuscript consists of three leaves. The manuscript contains two texts: the text of part of the Greek translation of the Hebrew Bible, and the Palestinian Talmud. The texts have been written 90 degrees apart.

Aquila's translation 
Aquila's translation was undertaken around the year c.130 C.E. Aquila's text contains parts of Psalms 90-103. The fragments contain Psalms 90:17, 91:1-16, 92:1-10, 93:3, 96:7-13, 97:1-12, 102:16-29, and 103:1-13. According to Taylor, the script of this manuscript is similar to that of the AqBurkitt, in bold uncial letters, without capital letter either at beginnings or paragraphs or as the first letter of the page.

Tetragrammaton 
The manuscript is written in koine Greek, but it contains the tetragrammaton in archaic Hebrew script characters in Ps 91:2, 9; 92:1, 4, 5, 8, 9; 96:7, 7, 8, 9, 10, 13; 97:1, 5, 9, 10, 12; 102:15, 16, 19, 21; 103:1, 2, 6, 8.

Palestinian Talmud 
The upper text is the Palestinian Talmud written in Hebrew.

Location 
Today the manuscript is kept at Library of the University of Cambridge.

See also 
 Septuagint manuscripts
 Papyrus Rylands 458 the oldest manuscript

References

Sources

External links 
Image of mss. AqTaylor

4th-century biblical manuscripts
5th-century biblical manuscripts